Dawda Leigh (born 27 June 1986) is a Norwegian former professional footballer who played as a winger for Skeid, Vålerenga, Sandefjord and Moss. He is of Gambian descent and represented Norway at youth international level.

Club career
Leigh was born in Oslo and played for Ellingsrud before he joined the First Division side Skeid in 2003. He was invited on a trial with Rosenborg in January 2005, but rejected their offer as he was called up to play for Norway U19. After playing for Skeid for five seasons Leigh signed for the Tippeligaen side Vålerenga together with his teammate Mostafa Abdellaoue in September 2008. They were both free agents and joined the club in January 2009. Leigh made his debut in Tippeligaen against Rosenborg on 15 March 2009. In his debut at Ullevaal Stadion, he assisted Bengt Sæternes' goal in the 1–1 draw against Aalesund.

Despite playing in the Second Division with Skeid the previous season, Leigh instantly became a regular in Vålerenga's starting line-up and started nine of the ten first matches of the season, and played a total of 21 matches scoring one goal in 2009. Leigh struggled in his second season at Vålerenga and played only 152 minutes in Tippeligaen. After another season with limited playtime he wanted to go on loan to Odd Grenland in August 2011, but stayed at Vålerenga for one more year, and played 12 matches for the club until he left the club in August 2012. Leigh played a total of 57 matches and scored one goal for Vålerenga in Tippeligaen.

Leigh signed a contract lasting to the end of the 2012 season with the First Division side Sandefjord in August 2012 He played nine league-matches for Sandefjord, in addition to the promotion play-off match against Ullensaker/Kisa, which Sandefjord lost 4–3. After his contract expired, he was linked to English club Bolton Wanderers.

Leigh signed a contract for the 2015 season with the First Division side Kristiansund in March 2015.

International career
Leigh has represented Norway at youth international level, and played 11 matches and scored one goal for Norway U18 in 2004 before he played four matches for Norway U19 in 2005.

Personal life
Leigh is a supporter of Manchester United and stated in an interview in 2005 that he would reject Liverpool if they wanted to sign him one day.

Career statistics

References

1986 births
Living people
Footballers from Oslo
Norwegian people of Gambian descent
Norwegian footballers
Association football wingers
Eliteserien players
Norwegian First Division players
Skeid Fotball players
Vålerenga Fotball players
Sandefjord Fotball players
Kristiansund BK players